Crow was a Lakota Sioux chief who gave the opening battle cry at the Battle of the Little Big Horn.

References
Lafarge, Oliver. (MCMLVI). A Pictorial History of the American Indian. Crown Publishers Inc. Page 177.

Native American leaders
Native American people of the Indian Wars
People of the Great Sioux War of 1876
Lakota people
Year of birth unknown
Year of death missing
19th-century Native Americans